The George E. Mitchell Black-Eyed Susan Stakes is a Grade II American Thoroughbred horse race for three-year-old fillies run over a distance of  miles on the dirt  annually at Pimlico Race Course in Baltimore, Maryland. The event currently offers a purse of $250,000

History 
The event was inaugurated in 1919 as the Pimlico Oaks and was renamed in 1952 to its present name to complement the Preakness Stakes and to acknowledge the Maryland State flower. The inaugural edition was won by Milkmaid who went on to earn United States Champion 3-Yr-Old Filly honors. Milkmaid's owner J. K. L. Ross had a very good 1919 racing campaign, also winning the first U.S. Triple Crown with the colt Sir Barton.

The Black-Eyed Susan was given graded stakes race status in 1973.

Twenty-three fillies that won The Black-Eyed Susan went on to be named a Champion according to the Maryland Jockey Club, those fillies include; Royal Delta, Silverbulletday, Serena's Song, Family Style, Davona Dale, What a Summer, My Juliet, Office Queen, Process Shot,  Airmans Guide, High Voltage, Real Delight, Wistful III, But Why Not, Gallorette, Twilight Tear, Vagrancy, Fairy Chant, Nellie Morse, Maid at Arms, Careful, Cleopatra and Milkmaid.

Davona Dale is the only filly to win the Black-Eyed Susan Stakes, Kentucky Oaks, Acorn Stakes, Mother Goose Stakes, and Coaching Club American Oaks. Nellie Morse is the only winner to also win the Preakness Stakes.

As a result of the entire Preakness Stakes being run behind closed doors, on August 21, 2020, Pimlico announced the Black-Eyed Susan Stakes will move to the Preakness Stakes card instead of being run on Friday, before, moving the event to the main NBC broadcast.  On October 1, 2020, the race was officially renamed the George E. Mitchell Stakes in memory of the longtime Park Heights community leader who had died in 2020.

Filly Triple Crown 

In its 95th running as of 2019, the Black-Eyed Susan Stakes is one of three races that are the de facto distaff counterparts to the Triple Crown races, along with the Kentucky Oaks at Churchill Downs and the Acorn Stakes at Belmont Park.  These races have been unofficially referred to as the "Filly Triple Crown."  Three races run at Belmont and Saratoga Race Course in New York are also called the Triple Tiara to avoid trademark conflicts.  However, consideration has been given within the National Thoroughbred Racing Association (NTRA), the sport's governing body in the United States, to change the Triple Tiara series to the Kentucky Oaks, the Black-Eyed Susan Stakes and the Mother Goose Stakes.

Records 

Speed record:
 1- miles - 1:47.83 - Silverbulletday (1999)
 1- miles - 1:41 2/5 - Lucky Lucky Lucky (1984)

Most wins by a jockey:
 4 - Chris McCarron (1976, 1985, 1986 & 1992)
 4 - John Velazquez (1998, 2003, 2005 & 2012)

Most wins by a trainer:
 4 - D. Wayne Lukas (1984, 1986, 1989 & 1995)
 4 - Todd Pletcher (2005, 2007, 2012 & 2014)

Winners

Notes:

† Smart N Pretty won the 2006 race but was disqualified from first place for interference.

The 16 fillies whose name appear in Bold were named either (14) American Champion Three-Year-Old Filly or (8) American Champion Older Female Horse and in (6) cases they were named Champion in both divisions.

See also 
 Black-Eyed Susan Stakes "top three finishers" and # of starters
 American thoroughbred racing top attended events

References 

 
1919 establishments in Maryland
Horse races in Maryland
Pimlico Race Course
Flat horse races for three-year-old fillies
Graded stakes races in the United States
Recurring sporting events established in 1919